Abdul Jabbar (born 18 April 1952, Hyderabad, India) is a former Tamil Nadu cricketer. In a 15-year career, he scored more than 4000 runs in first class cricket.

References
 Cricketarchive Profile
 Cricinfo Profile
 Committed Strokes, Hindu article on Jabbar

Indian cricketers
Tamil Nadu cricketers
1952 births
Living people
Cricketers from Hyderabad, India